Werner syndrome ATP-dependent helicase, also known as DNA helicase, RecQ-like type 3, is an enzyme that in humans is encoded by the WRN gene. WRN is a member of the RecQ Helicase family.  Helicase enzymes generally unwind and separate double-stranded DNA. These activities are necessary before DNA can be copied in preparation for cell division (DNA replication). Helicase enzymes are also critical for making a blueprint of a gene for protein production, a process called transcription. Further evidence suggests that Werner protein plays a critical role in repairing DNA. Overall, this protein helps maintain the structure and integrity of a person's DNA.

The WRN gene is located on the short (p) arm of chromosome 8 between positions 12 and 11.2, from base pair 31,010,319 to base pair 31,150,818.

Structure and function 

WRN is a member of the RecQ Helicase family. It is the only RecQ Helicase that contains 3' to 5' exonuclease activity. These exonuclease activities include degradation of recessed 3' ends and initiation of DNA degradation from a gap in dsDNA. WRN is important in repair of double strand breaks by homologous recombination or non-homologous end joining, repair of single nucleotide damages by base excision repair, and is effective in replication arrest recovery.  WRN may also be important in telomere maintenance and replication, especially the replication of the G-rich sequences.

WRN is an oligomer that can act as a monomer when unwinding DNA, but as a dimer in solution or a tetramer when complexed with DNA, and has also been observed in hexameric forms. The diffusion of WRN has been measured to 1.62    in nucleoplasm and 0.12    at nucleoli. Orthologs of WRN have been found in a number of other organisms, including Drosophila, Xenopus, and C. elegans. WRN is important to genome stability, and cells with mutations to WRN are more susceptible to DNA damage and DNA breaks.

The amino terminus of WRN is involved in both helicase and nuclease activities, while the carboxyl-terminus interacts with p53, an important tumor suppressor. WRN may function as an exonuclease in DNA repair, recombination, or replication, as well as resolution of DNA secondary structures. It is involved in branch migration at Holliday junctions, and it interacts with other DNA replication intermediates. mRNA that codes for WRN has been identified in most human tissues.

Post-translational modification 

Phosphorylation of WRN at serine/threonine inhibits helicase and exonuclease activities which are important to post-replication DNA repair. De-phosphorylation at these sites enhances the catalytic activities of WRN. Phosphorylation may affect other post-translational modifications, including sumoylation and acetylation.

Methylation of WRN causes the gene to turn off. This suppresses the production of the WRN protein and its functions in DNA repair.

Clinical significance 
Werner syndrome is caused by mutations in the WRN gene.  More than 20 mutations in the WRN gene are known to cause Werner syndrome. Many of these mutations result in an abnormally shortened Werner protein. Evidence suggests that the altered protein is not transported into the cell nucleus, where it normally interacts with DNA. This shortened protein may also be broken down too quickly, leading to a loss of Werner protein in the cell. Without normal Werner protein in the nucleus, cells cannot perform the tasks of DNA replication, repair, and transcription. Researchers are still determining how these mutations cause the appearance of premature aging seen in Werner syndrome.

WRN roles in DNA repair pathways

Homologous recombinational repair
WRN is active in homologous recombination.  Cells defective in the WRN gene have a 23-fold reduction in spontaneous mitotic recombination, with especial deficiency in conversion-type events.  WRN defective cells, when exposed to x-rays, have more chromosome breaks and micronuclei than cells with wild-type WRN.   Cells defective in the WRN gene are not more sensitive than wild-type cells to gamma-irradiation, UV light, 4 – 6 cyclobutane pyrimidines, or mitomycin C, but are sensitive to type I and type II topoisomerase inhibitors.   These findings suggested that the WRN protein takes part in homologous recombinational repair and in the processing of stalled replication forks.

Non-homologous end joining
WRN has an important role in non-homologous end joining (NHEJ) DNA repair.  As shown by Shamanna et al., WRN is recruited to double-strand breaks (DSBs) and participates in NHEJ with its enzymatic and non-enzymatic functions. At DSBs, in association with Ku (protein), it promotes standard or canonical NHEJ (c-NHEJ), repairing double-strand breaks in DNA with its enzymatic functions and with a fair degree of accuracy.  WRN inhibits an alternative form of NHEJ, called alt-NHEJ or microhomology-mediated end joining (MMEJ).  MMEJ is an inaccurate mode of repair for double-strand breaks.

Base excision repair
WRN has a role in base excision repair (BER) of DNA.  As shown by Das et al., WRN associates with NEIL1 in the early damage-sensing step of BER.  WRN stimulates NEIL1 in excision of oxidative lesions.  NEIL1 is a DNA glycosylase that initiates the first step in BER by cleaving bases damaged by reactive oxygen species (ROS) and introducing a DNA strand break via NEIL1's associated lyase activity.  NEIL1 recognizes (targets) and removes certain ROS-damaged bases and then incises the abasic site via β,δ elimination, leaving 3′ and 5′ phosphate ends. NEIL1 recognizes oxidized pyrimidines, formamidopyrimidines, thymine residues oxidized at the methyl group, and both stereoisomers of thymine glycol.

WRN also participates in BER through its interaction with Polλ.  WRN binds to the catalytic domain of Polλ and specifically stimulates DNA gap filling by Polλ over 8-oxo-G followed by strand displacement synthesis.  This allows WRN to promote long-patch DNA repair synthesis by Polλ during MUTYH-initiated repair of 8-oxo-G:A mispairs.

Replication arrest recovery
WRN is also involved in replication arrest recovery.  If WRN is defective, replication arrest results in accumulation of DSBs and enhanced chromosome fragmentation.  As shown by Pichierri et al., WRN interacts with the RAD9-RAD1-HUS1 (9.1.1) complex, one of the central factors of the replication checkpoint. This interaction is mediated by the binding of the RAD1 subunit to the N-terminal region of WRN and is instrumental for WRN relocalization to nuclear foci and its phosphorylation in response to replication arrest.  (In the absence of DNA damage or replication fork stalling, WRN protein remains localized to the nucleoli.)  The interaction of WRN with the 9.1.1 complex results in prevention of DSB formation at stalled replication forks.

WRN deficiencies in cancer

Cells expressing limiting amounts of WRN have elevated mutation frequencies compared with wildtype cells.  Increased mutation may give rise to cancer.  Patients with Werner Syndrome, with homozygous mutations in the WRN gene, have an increased incidence of cancers, including soft tissue sarcomas, osteosarcoma, thyroid cancer and melanoma.

Mutations in WRN are rare in the general population.  The rate of heterozygous loss of-function mutation in WRN is approximately one per million.  In a Japanese population the rate is 6 per 1,000, which is higher, but still infrequent.

Mutational defects in the WRN gene are relatively rare in cancer cells compared to the frequency of epigenetic alterations in WRN that reduce WRN expression and could contribute to carcinogenesis.  The situation is similar to other DNA repair genes whose expression is reduced in cancers due to mainly epigenetic alterations rather than mutations (see Frequencies of epimutations in DNA repair genes).

The table shows results of analysis of 630 human primary tumors for WRN CpG island hypermethylation.  This hypermethylation caused reduced protein expression of WRN, a common event in tumorigenesis.

Interactions 
Werner syndrome ATP-dependent helicase has been shown to interact with:

 BLM 
 DNA-PKcs, 
 FEN1, 
 Ku70, 
 Ku80, 
 P53, 
 PCNA, 
 TERF2, and
 WRNIP1.

References

Further reading

External links 
  In 
 GeneCard
 Werner Syndrome Mutational Database 

Genes on human chromosome 8